Rauni Magga Lukkari is a Sámi poet and translator. Although she was born in Vetsikko, Utsjoki, Finland in 1943, she has lived in Tromsø, Norway for more than 20 years. Lukkari writes in Northern Sami.

Works

Books
 Jieŋat vulget (1980)
 Báze dearvan, Biehtar (1981)
 Losses beaivegirji (1986)
 Mu gonagasa gollebiktasat (1991)
 Čalbmemihttu (1995)
 Árbeeadni (1996)
 Dearvvuođat (1999)

Translations
 Laila Stien: Olle P ja imas beaivvás (1991)
 Einar Bragi: Vaikke jiehkki jávkkodivccii (1998)
 Marion Palmer: Utsatte strök/Rasis guovllut (1999)
 Kati-Claudia Fofonoff Eana áđai nuppebeliid (2000)
 Dás álget johtolagat. Barents guovllu antologia (2001, translation into Northern Sámi by Jovnna-Ánde Vest, Rauni Magga Lukkari and Petter Johanas Lukkari)
 Riina Katajavuori: Gii halla (2004, translation into Northern Sámi by Rauni Magga Lukkari and Petter Johanas Lukkari)
 Edith Södergran: Manin munnje eallin addui (2004, translation into Northern Sámi by Rauni Magga Lukkari and Petter Johanas Lukkari)

References

External links
 Lukkari, Rauni Magga | Nordic Women's Literature
 Lukkari's poem The Mother, translated by Kenneth C. Steven.
 Women in Saami Society

1943 births
Living people
People from Utsjoki
Finnish Sámi people
Finnish Sámi-language writers
Finnish writers